The Morris House is a historic house at 407 SW Fourth Street in Bentonville, Arkansas.  Built c. 1855, this single-story frame structure is one of the few surviving pre-Civil War structures in Benton County.  It has a side gable roof, narrow clapboard siding, a wide frieze board, and capped corner boards giving a hint of Greek Revival styling.  Its original owner and exact construction date are not known.

The house was listed on the National Register of Historic Places in 1988.

See also
National Register of Historic Places listings in Benton County, Arkansas

References

Houses on the National Register of Historic Places in Arkansas
Houses completed in 1855
Houses in Bentonville, Arkansas
National Register of Historic Places in Bentonville, Arkansas
1855 establishments in Arkansas
Greek Revival houses in Arkansas